Boom Gorge is a river gorge in Chüy Region and Issyk-Kul Region of Kyrgyzstan.

The gorge cuts, in a general north–south direction, across one of Tian Shan's mountain range systems. The range east of the gorge is known as Kyungey Ala-Too (based on similar Kyrgyz spelling), the one to the west is the Kyrgyz Ala-Too.

The river Chu passes northwards through it and then enters the wider Chüy Valley. The Bishkek-Tokmak-Kemin-Balykchy highway (A365) passes through the gorge, as does the railway from Bishkek to Balykchy.

References

Canyons and gorges of Kyrgyzstan